In Greek mythology, Melia (Ancient Greek Μελία, Μελίη) was an Oceanid, one of the 3,000 water nymph daughters of the Titans Oceanus and his sister-spouse Tethys. She was the mother of culture hero Phoroneus, and Aegialeus, by her brother Inachus, the river-god of Argos. However, in some accounts, Inachus fathered Phoroneus by an Oceanid nymph named Argia. According to Argive tradition, Phoroneus was the first man, or first inhabitant of Argos, who lived during the time of the Great Flood, associated with Deucalion.

Melia was also said to have been the mother, by Inachus, of Mycene, the wife of Arestor, and eponym of Mycenae. Melia was also perhaps considered to be the mother, by Inachus, of Io, the ancestress, by Zeus, of the Greek dynasties of Argos, Thebes, and Crete.

The consort of Apollo, who was an important cult figure at Thebes, was also said to be a daughter of Oceanus named Melia.

Notes

References
 Apollodorus, Apollodorus, The Library, with an English Translation by Sir James George Frazer, F.B.A., F.R.S. in 2 Volumes. Cambridge, Massachusetts, Harvard University Press; London, William Heinemann Ltd. 1921.  Online version at the Perseus Digital Library.
 Fowler, R. L. (2013), Early Greek Mythography: Volume 2: Commentary, Oxford University Press, 2013. .
 Gantz, Timothy, Early Greek Myth: A Guide to Literary and Artistic Sources, Johns Hopkins University Press, 1996, Two volumes:  (Vol. 1),  (Vol. 2).
 Hard, Robin, The Routledge Handbook of Greek Mythology: Based on H.J. Rose's "Handbook of Greek Mythology", Psychology Press, 2004, .
 Hyginus, Gaius Julius, Fabulae in Apollodorus' Library and Hyginus' Fabulae: Two Handbooks of Greek Mythology, Translated, with Introductions by R. Scott Smith and Stephen M. Trzaskoma, Hackett Publishing Company,  2007. .
 Grimal, Pierre, The Dictionary of Classical Mythology, Wiley-Blackwell, 1996, .
 Larson, Jennifer, "Greek Nymphs : Myth, Cult, Lore", Oxford University Press (US). June 2001. 
 Ovid. Heroides. Amores. Translated by Grant Showerman. Revised by G. P. Goold. Loeb Classical Library No. 41. Cambridge, MA: Harvard University Press, 1977. . Online version at Harvard University Press.
 Pausanias, Pausanias Description of Greece with an English Translation by W.H.S. Jones, Litt.D., and H.A. Ormerod, M.A., in 4 Volumes. Cambridge, Massachusetts, Harvard University Press; London, William Heinemann Ltd. 1918. Online version at the Perseus Digital Library.
 Plato, Timaeus in Plato in Twelve Volumes, Vol. 9 translated by W.R.M. Lamb. Cambridge, MA, Harvard University Press; London, William Heinemann Ltd. 1925. Online version at the Perseus Digital Library.
 Tripp, Edward, Crowell's Handbook of Classical Mythology, Thomas Y. Crowell Co; First edition (June 1970). .
 West, M. L., Greek Epic Fragments: From the Seventh to the Fifth Centuries BC. Edited and translated by Martin L. West. Loeb Classical Library No. 497. Cambridge, Massachusetts: Harvard University Press, 2003. Online version at Harvard University Press.

Oceanids
Mythology of Argolis